The 2000–01 Hawaii Rainbow Warriors basketball team represented the University of Hawaiʻi at Mānoa in the 2000–01 NCAA Division I men's basketball season. The Rainbow Warriors, led by head coach Riley Wallace, played their home games at the Stan Sheriff Center in Honolulu, Hawaii, as members of the Western Athletic Conference. The Rainbow Warriors finished 5th in the WAC during the regular season, but landed three upset victories in three days during the WAC tournament, finishing with a 78–72 overtime victory over host  in the championship game.

As WAC tournament champions, Hawaii earned an automatic bid to the NCAA tournament, and were given the 12th seed in the Midwest region. The Rainbow Warriors were eliminated in the first round of the tournament, losing to Syracuse, 79–69.

Roster 

Source

Schedule and results

|-
!colspan=9 style=|Regular season

|-
!colspan=9 style=| WAC tournament

|-
!colspan=9 style=| NCAA tournament

Source

References

Hawaii Rainbow Warriors basketball seasons
Hawaii
Hawaii
Hawaii men's basketball
Hawaii men's basketball